The 2021–22 College of Charleston Cougars men's basketball team represented the College of Charleston in the 2021–22 NCAA Division I men's basketball season. The Cougars, led by first-year head coach Pat Kelsey, played their home games at the TD Arena in Charleston, South Carolina as members of the Colonial Athletic Association. The Cougars finished the season 17–15, 8–10 in CAA play to finish in sixth place. They defeated Hofstra in the quarterfinals of the CAA tournament before losing to UNC Wilmington in the semifinals.

Previous season
In a season limited due to the ongoing COVID-19 pandemic, the Cougars finished the 2020–21 season 9–10, 6–4 CAA play to finish in third place. They lost in the quarterfinals of the CAA tournament to Drexel.

Following the season, head coach Earl Grant was hired as the new coach at Boston College. Shortly thereafter, the school named Winthrop coach Pat Kelsey the team's new head coach.

Roster

Schedule and results 

|-
!colspan=12 style=|Non-conference regular season

|-
!colspan=9 style=|CAA regular season

|-
!colspan=12 style=| CAA tournament

|-

Source

References

College of Charleston Cougars men's basketball seasons
College of Charleston Cougars
College of Charleston Cougars men's basketball
College of Charleston Cougars men's basketball